The Zwicky Transient Facility (ZTF, obs. code: I41) is a wide-field sky astronomical survey using a new camera attached to the Samuel Oschin Telescope at the Palomar Observatory in California, United States. Commissioned in 2018, it supersedes the (Intermediate) Palomar Transient Factory (2009–2017) that used the same observatory code. It is named after the astronomer Fritz Zwicky.

Description 

Observing in visible and infra-red wavelengths, the Zwicky Transient Facility is designed to detect transient objects that rapidly change in brightness, for example supernovae, gamma ray bursts, and collision between two neutron stars, and moving objects like comets and asteroids. The new camera is made up of 16 CCDs of 6144×6160 pixels each, enabling each exposure to cover an area of 47 square degrees. The Zwicky Transient Facility is designed to image the entire northern sky in three nights and scan the plane of the Milky Way twice each night to a limiting magnitude of 20.5 (r band, 5σ). The amount of data produced by ZTF is expected to be 10 times larger than its predecessor, the Intermediate Palomar Transient Factory. ZTF’s large data will allow it to act as a prototype for the Vera C. Rubin Observatory (formerly Large Synoptic Survey Telescope) that is expected to be in full operation in 2023 and will accumulate 10 times more data than ZTF.

First light was recorded of an area in the constellation Orion on November 1, 2017.

The first confirmed findings from the ZTF project were reported on 7 February 2018, with the discovery of 2018 CL, a small near-Earth asteroid.

Discoveries
 On 9 May 2019, ZTF discovered its first comet, C/2019 J2 (Palomar), a long-period comet.
 A search of the ZTF's archive identified images of the interstellar comet 2I/Borisov as early as December 13, 2018, extending observations back eight months.
 A search from ZTF's images identified Cataclysmic variable, ZTF J1813+4251 a binary with a period of under 1 hour.
 A very bright tidal disruption event called AT2022cmc with a redshift of 1.19325, among the brightest astronomical events ever observed.

See also 
 
 
 OGLE survey

References 

Astronomical surveys
Palomar Observatory